Mendipathar College, established in 1971, is a general degree college situated at Mendipathar, in Meghalaya. This college is affiliated with the North Eastern Hill University.

Departments

Arts
Garo
English
Asamese
History
Geography
Education
Economics
Philosophy
Political Science

References

External links
http://mendipatharcollege.blogspot.com

Universities and colleges in Meghalaya
Colleges affiliated to North-Eastern Hill University
Educational institutions established in 1971
1971 establishments in Meghalaya